"How I Met Everyone Else" is the fifth episode in the third season of the television series How I Met Your Mother and 49th overall. It originally aired on October 22, 2007. Gloria Calderon Kellett, the writer of this episode, won a National Council of La Raza ALMA award for Outstanding Writing for a Television Series for this episode on August 17, 2008. It was derected by Pamela Fryman.

Plot
At the bar, Ted introduces the gang to his newest girlfriend, whose name Future Ted can't remember and instead refers to as "Blah Blah.” Embarrassed that she and Ted met online, she makes up a story about how she saw Ted across a crowded room at a cooking class. Before she had arrived, Ted had already told the rest of the group that they met online. It soon becomes clear that she is neurotic and paranoid when she feels threatened by Robin. In order to change the subject, everyone begins to reminisce about how they all met each other, and their stories are told through flashbacks.

Throughout the stories, Blah Blah becomes increasingly paranoid, particularly when she learns that Ted and Robin met and dated for a while. When she wishes that she and Ted had a wonderful first meeting story like Lily and Marshall, Ted reluctantly counters that the story isn't as great as it sounds and tells the story of how he met Lily. Lily recounts the event differently. A furious Blah Blah storms out, upon discovering that Ted had kissed another woman, but not before revealing that she met Ted playing World of Warcraft. For the sake of Marshall and Lily's relationship, Ted accepts Marshall's story, though he is secretly unconvinced.

Critical response
 
Donna Bowman of The A.V. Club rated the episode with an A.

Staci Krause of IGN gave the episode 8.9 out of 10.

Omar G of Television Without Pity rated the episode with an A.

References

External links

How I Met Your Mother (season 3) episodes
2007 American television episodes